This is a list of yearly South Atlantic Intercollegiate Athletic Association football standings.

SAIAA standings

References

South Atlantic Intercollegiate Athletic Association
Standings